The Basilica of St. John the Baptist  also called Saarbrücken Basilica Is a catholic basilica located in the market of St. John (St. Johannes) in Saarbrücken in Germany.

The temple of St. John was administered at the time of the Reformation by a noble Protestant and only one chapel, the chapel of St. John, was assigned to those who remained faithful to the Catholic faith. In the eighteenth century, under the French government of Louis XIV, the Catholic population grew. Next, they financed the construction of a Basilica, which was the only religious building built on the site for a hundred years. The Basilica of St. John was built on the site of the chapel of the same name by the architect Friedrich Joachim Stengel between 1754 and 1758.

The Basilica was remodeled, destroyed and restored several times. The interior has been redesigned according to the original baroque between 1972 and 1975. The Basilica obtained its present name by a decision of Pope Paul VI, who made it a Basilica. The Basilica is part of a parish with five churches .

In addition to Catholic masses, organ concerts are regularly held.

See also
Roman Catholicism in Germany
Basilica of St. John the Baptist

References

Buildings and structures in Saarbrücken
Roman Catholic churches completed in 1758
Churches in Saarland
Minor basilicas in Germany
18th-century Roman Catholic church buildings in Germany